Waterford is a town in New London County, Connecticut. It is named after Waterford, Ireland. The population was 19,571 at the 2020 census. The town center is listed as a census-designated place (CDP) and had a population of 3,074 at the 2020 census.

Geography
Waterford is bordered on the west by the Niantic River.

Principal communities
Waterford
Graniteville
Jordan
Millstone
Morningside Park
Quaker Hill (06375)
Bartlett Point, Best View, Thames View

Other minor communities and geographic features are Cohanzie Hill, East Neck, Fog Plain, Gilead, Goshen, Great Neck, Harrisons, Lake's Pond, Logger Hill, Mago Point, Magonk, Mullen Hill, Oswegatchie, Pepperbox Road, Pleasure Beach, Ridgewood Park, Riverside Beach, Spithead, Strand, West Neck, Waterford Village.

History

Founding 
The first people immigrated from England in 1637 and came to the New London and Waterford area (at the time, this land was called West Farms). One of the first people who set sail for this area was John Winthrop, Jr. Waterford got its name for its proximity to being in between two rivers. The residents of Waterford resided in wigwams until they dug up plots for 38 houses near the Great Neck area. Winthrop was given several hundred acres of land, including Millstone Point and Alewife Cove. Various dams, mills, and ponds were constructed in these areas. The only expansion of people in the Waterford-New London area were the growth of families and children. Later on, more people immigrated to Waterford, including Welsh, Italian, Russian, Irish, and Scottish.

Waterford separated from New London on October 8, 1801. This happened after several farmers signed a petition to separate them. The first town meeting was held in November 1801 to appoint town officials: tax collectors, town surveyors, Fence Viewers, and First Selectman. Only the first selectman got paid at the time.

19th century
Waterford was a large agricultural town in the 19th century, having mostly sheep farms. Waterford was also widely known for its granite industry that lasted from the late 19th century to the 1930s. Graniteville is a district in Waterford that is named after this industry. The area today known as Crystal Mall was also home to granite quarries. Waterford's granite was used in many construction projects such as roads, the foundation for Fort Sumter, and the Statue of Liberty. Granite was replaced by concrete which slowly shrank the granite industry until the 1930s.

20th century
During the 20th century, sheep farms were replaced by dairy farms. Between 1920 and 1960, there were about 100 dairy farms in Waterford. In addition, there were 10 to 100 heads of cattle. Waterford also obtained its town seal in 1946. It was made by Martin Branner who was a cartoonist who also made the famous comic, Winnie Winkle. After  World War II, Waterford boomed with development. Many new roads and building were made. Also, Waterford's population increased by 10,000 between 1946 and the present time. In 1957, the first stop light was added in Waterford. In addition, the first retail center was built starting in 1960.

Demographics

The town consists of a wide variety of rural and city living. At the 2010 census, there were 19,517 people in 8,005 households, including 5,335 families, in the town.

The racial makeup of the town was 89.4% White, 2.5% African American, 0.5% Native American, 3.7% Asian, 0.1% Pacific Islander, 1.3% from other races, and 2.5% from two or more races. Hispanic or Latino of any race were 4.7% of the population.

There were 8,005 households, 26.4% had children under the age of 18 living with them, 53.0% were married couples living together, 9.2% had a female householder with no husband present, and 33.4% were non-families. 28.0% of households were made up of individuals, and 9.8% were one person aged 65 or older. The average household size was 2.38, and the average family size was 2.91.

The age distribution was 22.9% under the age of 20, 3.9% from 20 to 24, 21.3% from 25 to 44, 31.9% from 45 to 64, and 20.1% 65 or older. The median age was 46.1 years.

The median household income was $73,156 and the median family income  was $93,933. The per capita income for the town was $114,645. About 3.1% of families and 5.4% of the population were below the poverty line, including 3.9% of those under age 18 and 6.9% of those age 65 or over.

Town center
At the 2010 census, there were 2,887 people in 1,327 households, including 732 families, in the Waterford census-designated place, comprising the town center.

The racial makeup of the CDP was 87.8% White, 4.3% African American, 0.8% Native American, 2.9% Asian, 0.8% from other races, and 2.3% from two or more races. Hispanic or Latino of any race were 6.5% of the population.

There were 1,327 households, 20.4% had children under the age of 18 living with them, 39.5% were married couples living together, 11.5% had a female householder with no husband present, and 44.8% were non-families. 39.0% of households were made up of individuals, and 18.4% were one person aged 65 or older. The average household size was 2.11 and the average family size was 2.80.

The age distribution was 19.2% under the age of 20, 5.0% from 20 to 24, 4.1% from 25 to 44, 23.8% from 45 to 64, and 23.9% 65 or older.  The median age was 46.7 years.

The median household income was $59,886 and the median family income  was $69,543. The per capita income for the CDP was $71,509. About 4.6% of families and 7.7% of the population were below the poverty line, including 4.2% of those under age 18 and 20.4% of those age 65 or over.

Education
Elementary schools appeared in 1915 when Quaker Hill School was built. Earlier, a lot was set aside for Quaker Hill in 1725 while the town was split into three districts: "Neck and Nehantick quarters," "West," and the "North East." Each district would end up getting split into even more individual districts. Later on, a second schoolhouse was replaced, built in 1858. Cohanzie School was built in 1923. It replaced four schools: Gilead School, "Peter Baker" located on far northern Vauxhall Street, Lakes Pond brick building, and Cohanzie predecessor. Cohanzie was later closed in 2009 by the Town of Waterford. There has been discussions of renovating the remains of the building into a senior home.

Jordan Schoolhouse

1737 is the earliest mention of a schoolhouse in Waterford, known as the Jordan Schoolhouse, located on the Jordan Green. Farmers mainly wanted their children to be taught writing, reading, arithmetic, and religion. The Jordan School also influenced proper manners and obedience. Private lessons were of no need in Waterford, but were set up in the 19th century for those who had enough money to afford it. The Jordan School's last day of teaching was in the year 1979 with a final assembly. The Jordan School is still used but is held as a museum to the public.

Government

Town Meeting

Waterford's local government is structured using a representative town meeting system. There are four elective districts in town, and each one sends one representative to the town meeting per every 550 electors in that area. As of 2021, districts 1, 2, and 4 have 6 representatives, and district 3 has 7, giving the Town Meeting a total of 25 elected members. In 2021, ten Democrats, 1 Unaffiliated, and fourteen Republicans were elected to the body.

As of the 2021 election results, the Representatives of the Waterford Town Meeting are:

Economy
Waterford's economic center is predominantly retail chains, including a variety of mini-malls and the Crystal Mall. There are several family-owned delicatessens and restaurants. Waterford is also home to JayPro Sports, which manufactures sports equipment for baseball, basketball, and tennis, and to Dominion's Millstone Nuclear Power Plant. The plant consists of three reactors, the first built between 1966 and 1970. While Millstone's first reactor is no longer in operation, the remaining two still provide power to a variety of towns in New England.

Attractions

 Mago Point, Waterford, Connecticut is an area in Waterford that is home to many marine businesses.
 The Connecticut College Arboretum is a  arboretum and botanical garden which lies partially within Quaker Hill, a neighborhood of Waterford.
 The Eugene O'Neill Theater Center is located in Waterford, as is the Intentional Theatre.
 Waterford Beach
 Harkness Memorial State Park is a recreational area that provides a picturesque view of Long Island Sound. The park features the former mansion, gardens and grounds of Edward Harkness, who bought the property in 1907. Adjacent to the Harkness Memorial State Park is Camp Harkness for the Handicapped, a summer facility for children and adults with physical and/or mental disabilities. Most of what is now Camp Harkness for the Handicapped was once a golf course.
 The Waterford Speedbowl is a racetrack that first opened in 1951 by local businessmen and although it has changed ownership several times since, is still in operation today.
 In 2009, Waterford was the home of the game show Deal or No Deal, which was filmed at Sonalyst Studios.
 The Seaside Sanatorium continues to be considered prime real estate in Waterford, being a  shoreline property, located on the original parcel of 11 Magonk Pt. The property was designed by architect Cass Gilbert. The Sanatorium opened in 1934 to treat patients suffering from tuberculosis by using heliotherapy, until 1958 when patients relocated to Uncas on the Thames and it later became a Geriatric Hospital, which opened in 1959–1961. In 1961, the Sanatorium opened to treat people with Developmental Disabilities, staying open until 1996.

Emergency services

Police department
The Waterford Police Department has 47 officers on active duty. "The Waterford Police Department, commanded by Chief Marc Balestracci, also has a Board of Police Commissioners.  The rest of the department consists of Lieutenants, Sergeants, Patrol Officers, K-9 Officers, Detectives, Traffic Officer, Evidence/Court Officer, School Resource Officers and civilian Community Service Officers."

Crime
According to 2012 statistics, the crime rate in Waterford is below average compared to most cities in the United States.

Statistics
The murder rate for Waterford is 5.1 per 100,000 with one murder occurring in 2012. 6 robberies occurred as well as 38 assaults. In 2012, 55 burglaries, 451 thefts and 9 auto thefts occurred.

Fire service

The Town of Waterford is protected by a combination volunteer and career fire service, consisting of five fire companies located throughout the town.

Ambulance service

Ambulance service for the town is provided by Waterford Ambulance. The Waterford Ambulance Service (WAS) is a non-profit ambulance service dedicated to providing high quality emergency medical care to the residents and visitors of the Town of Waterford, Connecticut and surrounding communities with emergency medical services and ambulance transportation in accordance with established Federal and State laws and regulations.

Notable people
 
 
Sara Juli, modern dancer and choreographer
David Luria, Optometrist
Jan Merrill, Olympic Runner, first American woman to run the mile finals.

References

External links

Waterford Public Schools
Waterford Public Library
Waterford Police Department
Waterford Ambulance

 
Towns in New London County, Connecticut
Towns in Connecticut
Populated places on the Thames River (Connecticut)
Populated coastal places in Connecticut